Craig Sanford Redmond (born September 22, 1965) is a Canadian former professional ice hockey player who played 191 games in the National Hockey League. He played for the Edmonton Oilers and Los Angeles Kings.

Biography
Redmond was born in Dawson Creek, British Columbia.  As a youth, he played in the 1978 Quebec International Pee-Wee Hockey Tournament with a minor ice hockey team from the Fraser Valley.

Prior to playing pro hockey, Redmond played junior hockey in the BCJHL, where he finished fourth in scoring as a 16-year old defenseman, setting a record for points by a defenseman. He became an all-WCHA defenceman at the University of Denver as a 17-year-old freshman where he set an all-time school season points record for a defenceman in 1983.  He played the following season for the Canadian Olympic Team in 1984..  

Redmond was rated as the 4th best prospect by the NHL Central Scouting ratings, and was selected 6th overall in the 1984 NHL draft by the Los Angeles Kings.  He signed with Los Angeles and played regularly for two seasons, but a knee injury and inconsistent defensive play led to him being sent to the minors part way through his third season.  When he was sent to the minors again in 1987 he refused to report, and was eventually traded to Edmonton.  Edmonton also sent him to the minors, and he retired following the season at age 25.

Redmond is a part of the famous Redmond family in hockey, including Mickey Redmond, and Dick Redmond.

Career statistics

Regular season and playoffs

International

References

External links

1965 births
Living people
Canadian ice hockey defencemen
Denver Pioneers men's ice hockey players
Edmonton Oilers players
Ice hockey people from British Columbia
Ice hockey players at the 1984 Winter Olympics
Los Angeles Kings draft picks
Los Angeles Kings players
National Hockey League first-round draft picks
Olympic ice hockey players of Canada
People from Dawson Creek